Timothy A. Sanders (born 1982) is an American politician serving as the mayor of Blaine, Minnesota, since 2021 and a former member of the Minnesota House of Representatives. A member of the Republican Party of Minnesota, he represented District 37B, which included parts of Anoka County, in the northern part of the Twin Cities metropolitan area, from 2009 to 2017, having decided not to seek reelection in 2016.

Early life, education, and career
Sanders grew up in a military family on Wright Patterson Air Force Base near Dayton, Ohio. He graduated from the University of Minnesota in Minneapolis, earning his B.A. in political science with a minor in history. Sanders worked as an intern for former U.S. Representative Jim Ramstad in his Minnetonka office. He is also a commercial insurance representative for Fireman's Fund Insurance Company.

Minnesota House of Representatives
Sanders was first elected in 2008, succeeding first-term Representative Scott Kranz, who moved out of the district. He was reelected in 2010, 2012, and 2014. He did not seek reelection in 2016.

Blaine elections
In 2020, Sanders was elected to a four-year term as mayor of Blaine, Minnesota, and assumed office on 1 January 2021, replacing retiring mayor Tom Ryan.

References

External links 

 Project Votesmart - Rep. Tim Sanders Profile
 Session Weekly 1/30/2009: "Honored to serve: Sanders focuses on kitchen-table issues"
 Tim Sanders on Twitter
 Tim Sanders on Facebook

1982 births
Living people
University of Minnesota College of Liberal Arts alumni
People from Anoka County, Minnesota
Republican Party members of the Minnesota House of Representatives
21st-century American politicians